Uncial 069 (in the Gregory-Aland numbering), ε 12 (Soden), is a Greek uncial manuscript of the New Testament, dated paleographically to the 5th century.

Description 

The codex contains very small part of the Gospel of Mark 10:50.51; 11:11.12, on one parchment leaf (8 cm by 4.5 cm). The text is written in one column per page, 25 lines per page, 11-15 letters in line, in a calligraphic uncial hand. The letters A and M are not typical Egyptian.

The nomina sacra are written in an abbreviated way.

Text 

The Greek text of the codex is a representative of the Byzantine text-type. Aland placed it in Category III. It concurs with Codex Alexandrinus, and the parts preserved support the Textus Receptus reading at all nine points of variation from other early uncials. It could be a member of the Family Π. The text is too brief for certainty.

History 

Currently the manuscript is dated by the INTF to the 5th century.

The manuscript was discovered by the Egyptologist Bernard Grenfell (1869-1926) and the Papyrologist Arthur Hunt (1871-1934). It was presented to the University of Chicago in the early 20th century.

 Present location
The codex now is located at the Oriental Institute (2057) in University of Chicago.

See also 
 List of New Testament uncials
 Textual criticism
 Oxyrhynchus Papyri
 Papyrus Oxyrhynchus 2
 Papyrus Oxyrhynchus 4

References

Further reading 

 B. P. Grenfell & A. S. Hunt, Oxyrhynchus Papyri I (London, 1898), p. 7.
 C. R. Gregory, Textkritik des Neuen Testaments, Leipzig 1900, vol. I, p. 68.
 Merrill Mead Parvis, The Story of the Goodspeed Collection (Chicago, 1952), pp. 3–4.
 New Testament manuscript traditions. An exhibition based on the Edgar J. Goodspeed Collection of the University of Chicago Library, the Joseph Regenstein Library, January–March, 1973. University of Chicago. Library. Dept. of Special Collections. Exhibition catalogs (Chicago, 1973), 36.

External links 
 Images at the Goodspeed Manuscript Collection

Greek New Testament uncials
5th-century biblical manuscripts
003